Oleksandr Nedovyesov and Ivan Sergeyev were the defending champions, but Sergeyev decided not to participate.
Nedovyesov played alongside Farrukh Dustov and won the title by defeating Radu Albot and Jordan Kerr 6–1, 7–6(9–7) in the final.

Seeds

Draw

Draw

References 
 Main Draw

Samarkand Challengerandnbsp;- Doubles
2013 Doubles